Kentucky Route 109 (KY 109) is an  north–south state highway that traverses four counties in Kentucky's Pennyrile region. It traverses Christian, Hopkins, Webster, and Union counties.

Route description 
KY 109 starts at an intersection with KY 56 just east of the bridge over the Ohio River that marks the Illinois–Kentucky state line near Old Shawneetown, Illinois. KY 109 runs a few miles east of that bridge and heads south, passing through the Union County communities of Henshaw and Sturgis. It runs concurrently with U.S. Route 60 (US 60) for a few miles and then runs onto a southeasterly course into Webster County. Once in that county, KY 109 enters Providence, where it meets KY 120.

Shortly after exiting Providence, KY 109 enters the western part of Hopkins County. It meets KY 502 and KY 70 at Beulah. At Dawson Springs, KY 109 has junctions with I-69 and then US 62.

After exiting Dawson Springs, KY 109 enters Christian County and goes through the Pennyrile State Forest before reaching an intersection with KY 800, and eventually reaching Hopkinsville after crossing the Hopkinsville Bypass. KY 109 runs concurrently with several US and Kentucky routes throughout downtown Hopkinsville.

After departing US 41 on the southeast side of Hopkinsville following the interchange with the I-169, KY 109 goes to the unincorporated community of Saint Elmo, where it reaches its southern terminus at an intersection with KY 115 just north of I-24 not too far from Oak Grove.

Major intersections

References

External links 
Kentucky Transportation Cabinet 
KY 109 at KentuckyRoads.com 

0109
0109
0109
0109
0109